Stephen Singleton (1866–1915) was an English footballer who played in The Football League for Accrington. Stephen Singleton was a professional player who was released by Accrington at the end of the 1888–1889 season. He played in the inaugural Football League season of 1888-1889 and only played 4 League matches and both FA Cup matches. His debut was on the 27 October 1888, at Wellington Road, Birmingham, then home of Aston Villa. Accrington lost the match 3–4. Accrington finished the season in 7th place, 5 places below Aston Villa who finished Championship Runners-up.

Statistics
Source:

References

English footballers
Accrington F.C. players
English Football League players
1866 births
1915 deaths
Association football defenders